Marthasville Hardware Building is a historic commercial building located at Marthasville, Warren County, Missouri.  It was built in 1902, and is a two-story, frame building on a rubble stone foundation. It features stamped steel ornamentation on the front facade.

It was listed on the National Register of Historic Places in 2008.

References

Commercial buildings on the National Register of Historic Places in Missouri
Commercial buildings completed in 1902
Buildings and structures in Warren County, Missouri
National Register of Historic Places in Warren County, Missouri